The Montrose School House is a historic school building located in Montgomery County, Maryland, in North Bethesda, south of the city of Rockville. It is a one-story, rectangular, hip-roofed building of frame construction with a pebble-dash finish.  It is the best-preserved of the six functional school buildings constructed in Montgomery County around 1910.

It was listed on the National Register of Historic Places in 1983.

References

External links

, including photo   from 1975, at Maryland Historical Trust

National Register of Historic Places in Montgomery County, Maryland
School buildings on the National Register of Historic Places in Maryland
School buildings completed in 1909
Defunct schools in Maryland
1909 establishments in Maryland
Buildings and structures in Montgomery County, Maryland